Brigsteer is a village in Cumbria, England.

On 1 August 2016 it was included in the Lake District National Park.

Politics
In 1974, under the Local Government Act 1972, Brigsteer became part of the South Lakeland district, the administrative centre of which is Kendal.

Brigsteer is part of the Westmorland and Lonsdale parliamentary constituency for which Tim Farron is the current Member of Parliament, representing the Liberal Democrats.

See also

Listed buildings in Helsington

References

External links

Villages in Cumbria